Da Yoopers are an American comedy and novelty musical group from Ishpeming, Michigan, United States. They are known primarily for their comedic songs and skits, most of which center on life in the Upper Peninsula of Michigan. The band's name includes the term "yooper", slang for residents of that part of the state, and the use of "da" instead of "the" is typical of the Yooper dialect. The band's members are Jim Bellmore (guitar, bass guitar, vocals, songwriting, production) and his wife, Lynn Bellmore (née Anderson) (keyboards, vocals), along with Jim "Hoolie" DeCaire (drums, vocals, songwriting, production). The original band lineup in 1985 consisted of Anderson and DeCaire, along with Joe Potila (guitar, vocals, songwriting, production) and Jim Pennell (bass guitar, vocals), with a number of membership changes ensuing throughout the band's history. Da Yoopers have released twelve studio albums and two compilation albums, all through their own You Guys Records label.

History
Jim "Hoolie" DeCaire and Joe Potila, two songwriters from Ishpeming, Michigan, began writing music together in 1975. After unsuccessful attempts at getting songs cut by other artists, they began recording as Da Yoopers in 1985. The band's original lineup consisted of DeCaire on drums and Potila on guitar, with both also handling songwriting and production duties; completing the initial lineup were keyboardist Lynn Anderson and bassist Jim Pennell. All four founding members also alternated as vocalists. They were originally known as the Joe Arkansas Band. The band took their name from the word "yooper", a term for people of the "U.P.", an abbreviation for the Upper Peninsula of Michigan, and "Da" came from the Yooper dialect pronunciation of "the". The band toured throughout Michigan's Upper Peninsula for several years, before recording their first album, Yoopanese, in 1986 on their personal label, You Guys Records.

A second album, Culture Shock, was released a year later. This second album featured several comedy songs, including "Second Week of Deer Camp" and "Rusty Chevrolet" (the latter a parody of "Jingle Bells"), both of which became local hits, including considerable regional airplay throughout the Midwestern United States and on Dr. Demento's radio shows.

By the release of Camp Fever, the band's third album, Joe DeLongchamp had replaced Pennell as bass guitarist. In addition, Lynn Anderson married Jerry Coffey, who joined as percussionist and occasional drummer. It also included the first song of the band's career not to be written by Potila or DeCaire, as DeLongchamp wrote the title track. Yoop It Up, their fourth cassette, was released in 1989.

Early 1990s–present
Yoopy Do Wah, released in 1991, was the band's first album on compact disc. For this album, Dave "Doc" Bradbury replaced DeLongchamp on bass guitar. Also that year, a compilation titled For Diehards Only was released, featuring a selection of songs from the group's first four albums. Da Yoopers' 1993 album One Can Short of a Six-Pack featured both regular and Christmas songs, including a parody of "Grandma Got Run Over By a Reindeer" titled "Grandpa Got Run Over By a Beer Truck". Potila retired in 1995 and was replaced by Jim Bellmore, who also assumed Potila's former role as co-writer and co-producer with DeCaire. Also at this point "Cowboy" Dan Collins joined as rhythm guitarist and occasional vocalist. Bellmore's first studio appearance was on We're Still Rockin that same year. Potila died in 2001.

Two albums were released in 2000: Jackpine Savage and Naked Elves in Cowboy Boots, the latter an album of Christmas music. By this point, Bobby "Sy" Symons had become the band's touring drummer, although DeCaire continued to play drums in studio. Both Dan Collins and Jerry Coffey left shortly after Naked Elves in Cowboy Boots. Songs for Fart Lovers and Diehards II (a second compilation composed of songs from the first four albums) both came out in 2004, with the two-disc 21st Century Yoopers in Space following in 2006. This album also featured several guest contributions in both performing and songwriting. Lynn, who divorced Jerry in 2005, was again credited as Lynn Anderson on 21st Century Yoopers in Space, and married Bellmore shortly after that album's release. The last touring lineup consisted of the Bellmores, Lusardi, Symons, and DeCaire.

Lusardi died May 8, 2016. The band's 2018 album Old Age Ain't for Sissies! features the Bellmores and DeCaire as the remaining three members. Symons died August 20, 2020.

Tourist Trap

Da Yoopers also own and operate a gift shop near Ishpeming called "Da Yoopers Tourist Trap", featuring various Upper Peninsula-themed merchandise.

Da Yooper's tourist trap not only contains merchandise, but 2 museums as well. The first museum is a mineral museum that contains various minerals found in the Upper Peninsula of Michigan. It also has exhibits related to the local mining culture. This museum is found inside of Da Yooper's Tourist Trap. The other museum is an outdoor museum that is more oriented towards humor. It contains such things as a large chainsaw, called Big Gus, a large rifle, called Big Ernie, and Da Two-Holer (a very special outhouse). This comical museum has various other displays in which tourists are encouraged to see in order to understand the humor of the Yooper culture.

Members
The band's membership is:
Jim Bellmore: guitar, bass guitar, vocals
Lynn Bellmore: keyboards, vocals
Jim "Hoolie" DeCaire: drums, vocals

Former members
Glen Adams: sketch comedy
Jim Boyer: sketch comedy
Dave "Doc" Bradbury: bass guitar, vocals
Matt Bullock: sketch comedy
Dick "Dick E. Bird" Bunce: bass guitar, sketch comedy (died 2022)
Steve Calhoun: sketch comedy
Jerry "Cuppa" Coffey: drums, percussion, vocals, sketch comedy
"Cowboy" Dan Collins: rhythm guitar, drums, vocals, sketch comedy
Art Davis: sketch comedy
Joe DeLongchamp: bass guitar, vocals, sketch comedy
Chris Kukla: sketch comedy
Jerry "Mungo" LaJoie: sketch comedy
Pete "Casanova" LaLonde: sketch comedy
"Billy Bob" Langson: sketch comedy
Reggie Lusardi: bass guitar, vocals, sketch comedy (died 2016)
Robert "Dill" Nebel: sketch comedy
Jim Pennell: bass guitar, vocals
Joe Potila: lead guitar, vocals, sketch comedy (died 2001)
Mike "Mikku" Powers: sketch comedy
Bobby Symons: drums (died 2020)

Discography
All albums released on You Guys Records.Albums{|class="wikitable plainrowheaders"
!scope="col" | Album
!scope="col" | Release
|-
!scope="row"|Yoopanese
|align="right"|1986
|-
!scope="row"|Culture Shock
|align="right"|1987
|-
!scope="row"|Camp Fever
|align="right"|1988
|-
!scope="row"|Yoop It Up
|align="right"|1989
|-
!scope="row"|Yoopy Do Wah
|align="right"|1991
|-
!scope="row"|One Can Short of a 6-Pack
|align="right"|1994
|-
!scope="row"|''We're Still Rockin
|align="right"|1996
|-
!scope="row"|Jackpine Savage|align="right"|1999
|-
!scope="row"|Naked Elves in Cowboy Boots|align="right"|2000
|-
!scope="row"|Songs for Fart Lovers|align="right"|2003
|-
!scope="row"|21st Century Yoopers in Space|align="right"|2006
|-
!scope="row"|Old Age Ain’t for Sissies!''
|align="right"|2018
|}

Compilations

References

External links
 Da Yoopers' Official Website

Musical groups from Michigan
Musical groups established in 1975
People from Ishpeming, Michigan
American comedy musical groups
American novelty song performers
1975 establishments in Michigan